The Chinese hamster (Cricetulus griseus or Cricetulus barabensis griseus) is a rodent in the genus Cricetulus of the subfamily Cricetidae that originated in the deserts of northern China and Mongolia. They are distinguished by an uncommonly long tail in comparison to other hamsters, most of whose tails are stubby. Chinese hamsters are primarily nocturnal, however they will stay awake for brief periods, in between naps, throughout the day.

Description
Chinese hamsters grow to between 82 and 127 mm in body length (tail length 20–33 mm) and weigh 1.7 grams at birth, then as they get older can weigh 30–45 grams. Males have a fairly large scrotum relative to their body size. Their body proportions, compared to other hamster species – most of which tend to be compact – appear "long and thin" and they have (for a hamster) a relatively long tail. They live two to three years on average.

The wild colour is brown with a black stripe down the spine, black and grey ticks and a whitish belly. This coloration, combined with their lithe build and longer tail, makes them look "mousy" to some eyes and, in fact, they are members of the group called ratlike hamsters.

Chinese hamsters and Chinese striped hamsters are solitary, like most hamsters other than the three Phodopus species.

Taxonomy
The taxonomic names of the Chinese hamster and the closely related Chinese striped hamster are unsettled. Some authorities consider the Chinese hamster (Cricetulus griseus) and the Chinese striped hamster (Cricetulus barabensis) different species, whereas others classify them as subspecies,
in which case the Latin name of the Chinese hamster becomes Cricetulus barabensis griseus, and the Chinese striped hamster becomes Cricetulus barabensis barabensis.

Domestication
Chinese hamsters were first domesticated as lab animals, but have mostly fallen out of use. They were subsequently kept as pets (although not the pet hamster species commonly kept in North America).

Lab animals

In the past, before scientists started using other rodents, Chinese hamsters were commonly used lab animals. They were replaced by the common mouse and rat, which are more convenient to breed and to keep in small cages; however, several biotech drugs are still being produced by putting the gene for the protein into Chinese hamster ovary cells, which then produce the protein.

Pets
Female Chinese hamsters were generally kept as pets, and males used solely for breeding. Being naturally solitary, they tend to be aggressive if kept in enclosures which are too small, or are inhabited by other hamsters. They can be nippy, but quickly become tame. Once successfully tamed, they are easily handled. Chinese hamsters can be quite nervous as youngsters but, once they are tamed, can display an endearing calm and gentle character. One of their endearing habits is clinging to a handler's finger with all four paws – rather like a harvest mouse on a corn stalk.

Prohibitions
Some U.S. states, such as California and New Jersey, regard the Chinese hamster as a pest or an exotic animal, and require a special permit to own, breed or sell them.

Colour varieties
Besides the wild colour, a well-known variation in domesticated breeds is the "spotted-white" or "dominant-spot" Chinese hamster, which often is grayish-white all over, with only a dark stripe on its back.

As yet, there are only three colour varieties among domesticated Chinese hamsters are:
 normal / wild type
 dominant-spot or spotted-white
 black-eyed white

Normal and dominant-spot are readily available in the pet trade throughout the United Kingdom, whereas the black-eyed white is extremely rare; only a few are owned by hobbyist breeders in the U.K.

In media
The Chinese Dwarf Hamster is the animal of choice featured in the speculative evolution project Hamster's Paradise.

See also
 Chinese hamster ovary cell
 Chinese Striped Hamster

Footnotes

References

External links
 
 
 
 
 
 
  in Ensembl
 
 GBIF ID: 2438773  

Cricetulus
Mammals of Asia
Mammals described in 1867